The 2018 Super Provincial One Day Tournament was a List A cricket tournament that was played in Sri Lanka between 2 May and 10 June 2018, following the conclusion of the 2017–18 Super Four Provincial Tournament. Four teams took part in the competition: Colombo, Dambulla, Galle and Kandy. Galle and Colombo qualified for the final, after they finished first and second respectively in the group stage.

The final was originally scheduled to take place on 20 May 2018, but Sri Lanka Cricket issued a statement via Twitter to say that it was postponed indefinitely due to bad weather. The final was eventually played on 10 June 2018, at the Premadasa Stadium, Colombo, after nearly a delay of one month. Galle won the tournament, after beating Colombo by 75 runs in the rescheduled final.

Squads
The following teams and squads were named to compete in the tournament:

Points table

  Top two teams advanced to the final

Fixtures

Round Robin

Final

References

External links
 Series home at ESPN Cricinfo

Super Provincial One Day Tournament